Brandon Matthew Copeland (born July 2, 1991) is an American football linebacker who is a free agent. He was signed by the Baltimore Ravens as an undrafted free agent in 2013 and has also played for the Tennessee Titans, Detroit Lions, New York Jets, New England Patriots, and Atlanta Falcons. He played college football at the University of Pennsylvania.

Early life
Copeland is from Sykesville, Maryland. He is the grandson of former Baltimore Colts player Roy Hilton. Copeland graduated from the Gilman School where he played 3 sports: football, basketball and track. During his senior year of high school, Copeland was awarded the position of team captain.

He was on the championship squad at the 2006 Maryland Interscholastic Athletic Association. He received the National Football Foundation Scholar Athlete of the Year Award in 2008 and was an Academic All-State team honoree the same year.

College career
Copeland attended the University of Pennsylvania where he was the captain of the 2012 Ivy League championship winning team. He graduated from the Wharton School with a Bachelor of Science in economics.

Professional career

Baltimore Ravens

On April 27, 2013, he signed with the Baltimore Ravens as an undrafted free agent. He was waived on August 31, 2013.

Tennessee Titans
He signed with the Tennessee Titans to their practice squad on October 8, 2013. He was released from the Titans’ practice squad on November 5, 2013, but re-signed to the team's practice squad on November 12, 2013. He signed with the Titans to a future contract on December 31, 2013.

Detroit Lions
On April 7, 2015, Copeland signed a one-year contract with the Detroit Lions. It came after he participated in the NFL Veterans Combine, where he, along with Ifeanyi Momah, were the only participants to be offered contracts.

Copeland suffered a torn pectoral in the Lions' first preseason game of 2017 and was ruled out for the season.

New York Jets
On March 19, 2018, Copeland signed with the New York Jets. He played in 16 games with 10 starts, recording 35 combined tackles, and five sacks.

On March 25, 2019, Copeland re-signed with the Jets. He was suspended the first four games of the 2019 season for violating the league's policy on performance-enhancing substances. He was reinstated from suspension on October 7, 2019, and was activated prior to Week 6.
In week 9 against the Miami Dolphins, Copeland recorded a team high 9 tackles and sacked Ryan Fitzpatrick once in the 26–18 loss.

New England Patriots
On March 25, 2020, Copeland signed a $1.1 million contract with the New England Patriots. He was placed on injured reserve on October 28, 2020, after suffering a torn pectoral in Week 7.

Atlanta Falcons
On March 19, 2021, Copeland signed a one-year contract with the Atlanta Falcons. On September 11, he was waived by the Falcons, but was re-signed two days later.

Baltimore Ravens (second stint)
On September 21, 2022, Copeland signed with the Baltimore Ravens practice squad. He was released on October 18, 2022.

Personal life
Copeland interned at the investment bank UBS over two summers during college and has since returned to Penn to teach a financial literacy seminar with Dr. Brian Peterson, the director of Penn's Makuu Black Cultural Center.

References

External links
Penn Quakers bio

1991 births
Living people
American football defensive ends
American football linebackers
Atlanta Falcons players
Baltimore Ravens players
Detroit Lions players
New England Patriots players
New York Jets players
Orlando Predators players
Penn Quakers football players
People from Sykesville, Maryland
Players of American football from Maryland
Sportspeople from the Baltimore metropolitan area
Tennessee Titans players
Ed Block Courage Award recipients